Aganthukaya (English: The Outcast) is a 2007 Sri Lankan Sinhala drama film directed by Vasantha Obeysekera and produced by Anura Abeysekara for A.G.A Films with the funds of National Film Corporation of Sri Lanka. It stars Saumya Liyanage and Chandani Seneviratne in lead roles along with Sanath Gunathilake and Giriraj Kaushalya. Music composed by Rohana Weerasinghe. This is the last film directed by Vasantha Obeysekara. It is the 1087th Sri Lankan film in the Sinhala cinema.

The film has been shot in Kurunegala, for tireless seventeen days. The film has received mostly positive reviews from critics.

Plot
The story revolves around a school principal who was transferred to a national school in a far flung area as a political punishment. Through his dedication and perseverance the principal develops the school with impressive academic results.

Cast
 Saumya Liyanage as Sampath
 Chandani Seneviratne as Sampath's wife
 Sanath Gunathilake as Politician
 Giriraj Kaushalya        
 Nimal Anthony   
 Damayanthi Fonseka
 Somasiri Alakolange
 Chandrasoma Binduhewa

Awards
 Sarasaviya Award for the Best Script  
 Sarasaviya Award for the Best Film

References

2007 films
2000s Sinhala-language films
2007 drama films
Sri Lankan drama films